Novy Syntash (Yañı Hıntaş) is a rural locality (a village) in Kucherbayevsky Selsoviet, Blagovarsky District, Bashkortostan, Russia. The population was 43 as of 2010. There are 2 streets.

Geography 
Novy Syntash is located 35 km north of Yazykovo (the district's administrative centre) by road. Stary Syntash is the nearest rural locality.

References 

Rural localities in Blagovarsky District